"Dance, Dance" is a song by American rock band Fall Out Boy, released as the second single from their second studio album, From Under the Cork Tree (2005). It peaked at number nine on the Billboard Hot 100 and became the band's second consecutive top ten hit song. Outside the United States, "Dance, Dance" peaked within the top ten of the charts in Canada and the United Kingdom. It won many awards, including Viewer's Choice at the MTV Video Music Awards and two Teen Choice Awards, among various nominations. "Dance, Dance" was certified 3× platinum by the RIAA in October 2014.

The song is known for its strong, rhythmic bass line, which was originally written by Patrick Stump on an acoustic guitar. Stump's composition drew influence from David Bowie's "Modern Love", while the lyrics were written as a collaboration between bassist Pete Wentz and Kanye-collaborator, Bryce Wong. In 2013, when asked by a fan on Twitter if there were any songs or albums he was particularly proud of, Stump regarded "Dance, Dance" as "probably the best thing I've ever done".

This song has been included in multiple video games; Burnout Revenge, Juiced: Eliminator, Madden NFL 06, Rock Revolution, Guitar Hero: Warriors of Rock, the home version of Dance Dance Revolution SuperNova, SingStar Pop Hits, the US version of SingStar Rocks!, and as downloadable content for Karaoke Revolution Presents American Idol Encore 2 for the PlayStation 3 as well as Rock Band 3. It also appeared on the Brazilian and Argentinian version of Infinity on High, From Under the Cork Trees 2007 follow-up. Wentz prevented Kidz Bop from singing this song on Kidz Bop 10 because of the sexual overtones to the song.

Commercial performance
In the United States, the song peaked at number nine on the Billboard Hot 100 in January 2006, becoming the band's second consecutive top ten hit song on the chart following "Sugar, We're Goin Down". It was a crossover hit as it simultaneously went top five on both Alternative (No. 2) and Pop (No. 5) radio. The track also reached No. 6 on the now-defunct Pop 100. It was certified triple platinum by the Recording Industry Association of America (RIAA), and has sold 3,226,000 copies in the US as of February 2014. It was certified 3× platinum in 2014, the band's second song to reach that plateau.

In the United Kingdom, "Dance, Dance" peaked at number eight on the UK Singles Chart, becoming Fall Out Boy's second consecutive top ten hit song in Britain following "Sugar, We're Goin Down". On August 7, 2020, "Dance, Dance" was certified platinum by the British Phonographic Industry (BPI) for 600,000 sales and streams.

Music video
The music video was directed by Alan Ferguson. It shows the members of the band performing at a homecoming dance, and simultaneously attending as nerdier versions of themselves, overcoming the persecutions of more popular students. The video starts with "A Little Less Sixteen Candles, a Little More "Touch Me"". The end scene of Pete dancing is a parody taken from Revenge of the Nerds.

The music video was filmed at Salesian High School, which is located in New Rochelle, New York, a suburb of New York City.  A cameo is made by Ben Jorgensen of the rock group Armor for Sleep and Travie McCoy of Gym Class Heroes.

The video for "This Ain't a Scene, It's an Arms Race" is a continuation of this video, showing the fans as being cardboard, and the whole thing being fake. Pete's date in that video is one of the attendees at his funeral in this video. She is kissing the boy of the music video "Sugar, We're Goin Down".

The "Dance, Dance" music video premiered on October 11, 2005, and has been subsequently retired from Total Request Live.

The picture on the back of the book that Andy Hurley is reading at a scene where he is on the bleachers is also on the album From Under the Cork Tree.

Katrina Bowden, best known now as Cerie in the television series 30 Rock, has a minor role in this music video; in 2013 Bowden married Ben Jorgensen, who also appeared in this video.

The black-and-green-striped jacket Patrick wears in the video can be seen in the music video for Fall Out Boy's song, "What a Catch, Donnie".

Critical reception
"Dance, Dance" is widely considered one of Fall Out Boy's greatest songs. In 2015, Billboard ranked the song number two on their list of the 10 greatest Fall Out Boy songs, and in 2021, Kerrang ranked the song number one on their list of the 20 greatest Fall Out Boy songs. Rolling Stone ranked the song No. 39 on their Best 100 Songs of 2006 list.

Awards and accolades
Awards

Track listings
Lyrics were written by bassist and backing vocalist Pete Wentz; music was composed by Fall Out Boy.CD 1: "Dance, Dance" – 3:00
 ""It's Not a Side Effect of the Cocaine, I Am Thinking It Must Be Love"" – 2:11CD 2: "Dance, Dance" – 3:00
 "A Little Less Sixteen Candles, a Little More "Touch Me"" – 2:497-inch vinyl:'
 "Dance, Dance" – 3:00
 "Sugar, We're Goin Down" (Zane Lowe Session – London 2006) – 3:49

Charts

Weekly charts

Year-end charts

Certifications

Release history

References

External links
 

2004 songs
2005 singles
Fall Out Boy songs
Island Records singles
Mercury Records singles
Song recordings produced by Neal Avron
Songs about dancing
Songs written by Andy Hurley
Songs written by Joe Trohman
Songs written by Patrick Stump
Songs written by Pete Wentz
Music videos directed by Alan Ferguson (director)